The Cobb House is a historic house near Grove Hill, Alabama.  The two-story I-house was built in 1865.  It was added to the Alabama Register of Landmarks and Heritage on January 29, 1980, and subsequently to the National Register of Historic Places on July 28, 1999.  It was listed due to its architectural significance as a part of the Clarke County Multiple Property Submission.

References

National Register of Historic Places in Clarke County, Alabama
Houses on the National Register of Historic Places in Alabama
Houses completed in 1865
Properties on the Alabama Register of Landmarks and Heritage
Houses in Clarke County, Alabama
I-houses in Alabama